Poritia kinoshitai is a butterfly of the family Lycaenidae first described by Hisakazu Hayashi in 1976. Its forewing length is 14–15 mm. It is a rare species and endemic to Palawan island in the Philippines.

References

 Hayashi, Hisakazu. (1976). "New species of Cyaniriodes libna, Poritia erycinoides and Panchala paraganesa from Palawan (Lepidoptera: Lycaenidae)". Tyô to Ga. 27 (2): 49–51.

 Treadaway, Colin G. & Schrőder, Heinz (2012). "Revised checklist of the butterflies of the Philippine Islands". Nachrichten des Entomologischen Vereins Apollo, Suppl. 20: 1-64.

Poritia
Lepidoptera of the Philippines
Butterflies described in 1976